Leonardo Drugovich (born 21 April 1989 in Maringá, Brazil) is a Brazilian former professional footballer who played as a midfielder for clubs in Brazil, Chile, Paraguay and Spain.

Clubs
 Racing de Santander 2000–2001
 Cerro Porteño 2001
 Joinville 2002
 Marilia 2003–2004
 Universidad de Concepción 2005–2007

References
 

1981 births
Living people
Brazilian footballers
Association football midfielders
Racing de Santander players
Cerro Porteño players
Joinville Esporte Clube players
Marília Atlético Clube players
Universidad de Concepción footballers
Chilean Primera División players
Brazilian expatriate footballers
Brazilian expatriate sportspeople in Chile
Expatriate footballers in Chile
Brazilian expatriate sportspeople in Paraguay
Expatriate footballers in Paraguay
Brazilian expatriate sportspeople in Spain
Expatriate footballers in Spain

Brazilian people of Slavic descent